Fati may refer to
Fati (god), the god of the moon in Polynesian mythology
Fati (name)
Fati Municipality in Libya
Amor Fati (disambiguation), multiple articles related to a philosophical concept